Belostoma bakeri is a species of giant water bug in the family Belostomatidae. It is found in Central America and North America.

References

Belostomatidae
Hemiptera of Central America
Hemiptera of North America
Insects described in 1913
Articles created by Qbugbot